Dry Branch is a stream in Ripley County in the U.S. state of Missouri. It is a tributary of Cypress Creek.

Dry Branch was named for the fact it often runs dry.

See also
List of rivers of Missouri

References

Rivers of Ripley County, Missouri
Rivers of Missouri